The Angostura Colorada Formation is a Campanian to Maastrichtian geologic formation of the Neuquén Basin and North Patagonian Massif in the Río Negro Province of Argentina. Dinosaur remains diagnostic to the genus level are among the fossils that have been recovered from the formation.

Description 
The Angostura Colorada Formation was defined by Volkhaimer in 1973 and unconformably overlies the Late Triassic volcanics of the Sañicó Formation. The formation is partly overlain by the Huitrera and Collón Cura Formations, and in other parts by the Coli Toro Member of the Los Alamitos Formation. The formation, outcropping south of Comallo, comprises sandstones, claystones and conglomerates deposited in a fluvial environment.

Paleofauna 
 Aeolosaurus rionegrinus
 Hadrosauridae indet.
 Saltasaurinae indet.
 Lithostrotia indet.

See also 
 List of dinosaur-bearing rock formations
 List of stratigraphic units with few dinosaur genera

References

Bibliography

Further reading 
 J. E. Powell. 1987. The Late Cretaceous fauna of Los Alamitos, Patagonia, Argentina part VI—the titanosaurids. Revista del Museo Argentina de Ciencias Naturales "Bernardino Rivadavia" e Instituto Nacional de Investigacion de las Ciencias Naturales: Paleontología 3(3):147-153

Geologic formations of Argentina
Upper Cretaceous Series of South America
Cretaceous Argentina
Campanian Stage
Maastrichtian Stage of South America
Sandstone formations
Shale formations
Conglomerate formations
Fluvial deposits
Formations
Geology of Río Negro Province